I Still Love, I Still Hope is a 1984 Soviet drama film directed by Nikolay Lyrchikov.

Plot 
The film tells about a man who all his life loved one woman. She was married, raised children and grandchildren, but despite this, all the while he remained her faithful friend. And suddenly, one fine New Year's evening, she knocks on his door.

Cast 
 Yevgeny Yevstigneyev as Vasiliy Vasilyevich
 Tamara Syomina as Agnessa Fyodorovna Zakharova
 Vyacheslav Nevinnyy as Boris Zakharov
 Valentina Talyzina as Antonina
 Marina Levtova as Lyusya
 Konstantin Lavronenko as Zhenya
 Boris Novikov as Pavel Petrovich
 Liliya Evstigneeva as Lidiya
 Lyudmila Gladunko as Zina
 Yevgeny Teterin as Pyotr

References

External links 
 

1984 films
1980s Russian-language films
Soviet drama films
1984 drama films